Gold Spot was one of the three brands of carbonated soft drink started in India by Parle Bisleri under the initiative of its founder Ramesh Chauhan in 1977 after the exit of Coca-Cola. PepsiCo had already left the Indian market in 1962 due to slow sales. Gold Spot was introduced along with Thums Up and Limca. 

It was artificially flavoured and coloured orange. Parle  sold Gold Spot along with Thums Up, Limca, Citra and Maaza to Coca-Cola in 1993 (which had just relaunched in the Indian market), reportedly for $40 million. In spite of its wide popularity, Gold Spot was withdrawn by Coke from the market in order to re-make space for Coca-Cola's Fanta brand.

Gold Spot's slogan was "The Zing Thing."

In popular culture
The Los Angeles-based band Goldspot is supposed to be named after this fizzy drink. According to one of the interviews with Siddhartha Khosla (the core member of band), Gold Spot was very popular back in India at the time.

References

Indian brands
Drink brands
Coca-Cola brands
Indian drink brands
Defunct brands